Fonyód is a district in northern part of Somogy County. Fonyód is also the name of the town where the district seat is found. The district is located in the Southern Transdanubia Statistical Region.

Geography 
Fonyód District borders with Tapolca District and Balatonfüred District (Veszprém County) to the north, Siófok District and Tab District to the east, Kaposvár District to the south, Marcali District to the west. The number of the inhabited places in Fonyód District is 21.

Municipalities 
The district has 4 towns and 17 villages.
(ordered by population, as of 1 January 2013)

The bolded municipalities are cities.

See also
List of cities and towns in Hungary

References

External links
 Postal codes of the Fonyód District

Districts in Somogy County